Kimberly Gwen Polman (born 1972) is a dual Canadian-U.S. citizen, who travelled to Daesh occupied territory in 2015, and married an Islamic militant she had befriended online.  In 2019, after she surrendered to forces allied to the United States, Polman told reporters she deeply regretted her actions.

Early life 
Born September 29, 1972.  Polman's mother is American, and her father Canadian.  She was raised as a Reformed Mennonite, but later converted to Islam.

In 2011, the Soroptimist International issued her a Women's Opportunity Award. Her citation said she was working on a diploma in Legal Administration, and planned to work as a children's advocate.

Time in Syria 
Polman had taken an interest in nursing, and her online penpal, who said his name was Abu Aymen, told her that her nursing skills were needed in the caliphate. The two later married.

In early 2015, Polman travelled from Vancouver to Istanbul on her US passport. She told her family that she was going to Austria for two weeks. 

Polman says she had grown disenchanted with Daesh by 2016, and tried to escape.  She says she was captured, and imprisoned, in Raqqa, where she endured brutal interrogation and rape.

Polman was held in the al-Hawl refugee camp in Syria, where she was held with New Jersey-born Hoda Muthana. Polman left three adult children in Canada when she travelled to Istanbul.  Polman's siblings told The New York Times that she had a hard life, and that they had been unable to help her. Howard Eisenberg, an immigration lawyer in Polman's home town, told local reporters for CHCH-TV that he anticipates her struggle to return to Hamilton to be a long one. Polman was arrested by Canadian authorities upon her arrival in Montreal Canada from Syria on October 26th under Section 810 of the Canadian Criminal Code. Her lawyer said authorities are seeking a peace bond.

Ian Austen, one of The New York Times Canadian correspondents wrote about Polman, after discussing her with Rukmini Callimachi, The New York Times reporter who first found her, in the refugee camp in Syria.  He wrote that Callimachi speculated that she first identified herself as a Canadian to her American captors because she would be treated more leniently, as a Canadian, only to realize that Canadians were "in limbo".  Callamachi speculated that Polman started to identify as an American when she realized that while Americans might face prosecution upon repatriation, at least they were being repatriated.

Polman's  case was one profiled in a study by the International Center for the Study of Violent Extremism, as to whether individuals had been recruited to join ISIS solely through online coaching.  Her interviews revealed she was lonely and vulnerable following a brutal gang-rape left her alienated from her children and community.  She believed her recruiter who promised her she could restore her honour, and purity, if only she came to Daesh to volunteer her nursing skills.

References

1973 births
Living people
Canadian Muslims
American expatriates in Syria
American Islamists
Canadian Islamists
Islamic State of Iraq and the Levant members
American people of Canadian descent
Canadian people of American descent
Converts to Islam from Christianity